Sue Belinda Giblin (born 2 March 1950) professionally billed as Belinda Giblin, is an Australian actress. Prominent in theatre and television soap operas, and several feature films.

Giblin's small screen roles include  The Box as Kay Webster (1974-1975), The Sullivans (1977–1978) as Sister Sue Marriott, Sons and Daughters (1985-1987), as Alison Carr and her two stints in Home and Away, firstly as Cynthia Ross in 1991, and then Martha Stewart, the long-presumed dead wife of Alf Stewart, a role she played on a recurring basis from 2018 to 2022.

Biography

Early life

Giblin was born in Tamworth, New South Wales, to Phyllis and Ted, she has two older brothers Ted Jn. and Graham and a younger sister Allison. Her father Ted was a doctor at the Tamworth Base Hospital. Her mother ran the dramatic society, and acted and directed in productions but then died of breast cancer when she was 23, her dad died when he was 83.
Giblin was offered a scholarship to the Australian Ballet School when she was 17, but chose to study arts at the University of Sydney. Then she studied at the National Institute of Dramatic Art, before leaving after a year to practise her craft.

Television roles

She played in the risqué, satirical 1970s soap opera The Box as Kay Webster, and the in the 1980s melodrama Sons and Daughters as Alison Carr. The Alison Carr character was revealed to be the post-plastic surgery incarnation of the show's original and much vaunted villain, 'Pat The Rat' – Patricia Hamilton, originally played by Rowena Wallace. Giblin was cast in the role because of her resemblance to Wallace.

Other credits

Giblin appeared in numerous roles by Crawford Productions over a 12-year period early in her career many filmed in black and white, television roles include appearances in Matlock Police, Division Four, Homicide, The Sullivans, Alvin Purple (1976), Bluey (1976), Heartbreak High, Skyways, Good Guys, Bad Guys, as well as Home and Away as Cynthia Ross in 1991 and Martha Stewart, the first wife of regular Alf Stewart, from 2018.

Since 2013, she has also guest starred in The Horizon, a gay shortform web-series on YouTube, as Wilma (the drag queen's) mother.

Theatre

In 2016, she performed at the Sydney Opera House, 'Blonde Poison', a one-woman show about a Jewish woman who became a Nazi collaborator during World War II.

In 2017, she appeared in 'Bent 101' as 'Babs DeVure' in an Australian short form comedy series that was on the Seven Network.

She also works as a corporate trainer.

Private life

Giblin has been married to Axel Bartz (a set designer) since around 1984. She was performing in a theatre production Bedroom Farce when it came to Adelaide and Axel was the resident designer of the Adelaide Theatre Company.
She has two children, Romy and Nicholas and lives in Leichhardt. Her father-in-law was in the German music corps.

Filmography

FILM

TELEVISION

STAGE/THEATRE
 You Can't Take It With You (1970)
 Girl In The Freudian Slip (1971)
 The Removalists (1972)
 The Anniversary (1972)
 Bloody Harry (1973)
 Martello Towers (1976)
 Bedroom Farce (1978)
 Quadraphrenia (1979)
 Errol Flynn's Great Big Adventure Book For Boys (1979)
 Taking Steps (1985)
 The World Is Made Of Glass (1985)
 Move Over Mrs Markham (1988)
 How The Other Half Loves? (1989;1995)
 Henceforward (1990)
 The Increased Difficulty Of Concentration (1990)
 Steaming (1991;1992;1994)
 Canaries Sometimes Sing (1993)
 Reflected Glory (1993)
 The Wild Party (1994;1995;1996;1997)
 Blithe Spirit (1996)
 Same Time, Another Year (1997)
 Social Climbers (1998)
 Bell, Book And Candle (1998)
 Things We Do For Love (1999)
 Noises Off (2001)
 The Wicked Sisters (2002)
 The Vagina Monologues (2002)
 Love Child (2003)
 Scam (2003)
 The Shoe-Horn Sonata (2004;205;2007)
 Away (2004)
 Dinner (2007)
 Absurd Person Singular (2009)
 Dark Voyager (2014)
 Daylight Saving (2014)
 Blonde Poison (2015;2016)
 The Turquoise Elephant (2016)
 Doubt (2017)
 John (2018)
 Ear To The Edge Of Time (2018)
 Happy Days (2019)
 Family Values (2020;2021)
 Ghosting The Party (2022)
 Amadeus (2022)
 Suddenly Last Summer (2023)
 The Weekend (2023)

References

External links

1950 births
Living people
Australian stage actresses
People from Tamworth, New South Wales
Australian soap opera actresses